Capilla de Guadalupe is a delegation and census-designated place within the municipality of Tepatitlan, in Jalisco in central-western Mexico.

As of 2017, the town was estimated to have a total population of 20,601.

References

Populated places in Jalisco